Lophorina is a genus of birds in the birds-of-paradise family Paradisaeidae that are endemic to New Guinea, formerly containing a single species, but as of 2017, containing three species.

Description
All members sport a jet-black to black body found only in males, while their female counterparts sport brown upperparts (shade depends on the species) with barred underparts; they have a relatively long to shortish, slender, crow-like bill, and various ornaments. All three species have a distinctive cape found on the nape that they push forward, an iridescent blue-green crown, and an iridescent blue-greenish breast shield that appears to be "smiling" (L. superba) and "frowning" (L. niedda) that the males use to court females. When it comes to the courtship of the female lophorina, males tend to start crouching, showing a repeated display of their breast shield and an exaggerated downward movement to show their crown to the female. During a high intensity display, the male will also fan his nape cape, forming a semi-circle overhead, and around breast shield, all while hopping around the female. When in full display, the birds look like an otherworldly cartoon character with a fully black face, blue eyes, and blue mouth as they try their best to hop and dance around a potential mate.

Taxonomy 
The genus Lophorina was introduced in 1816 by the French ornithologist Louis Jean Pierre Vieillot for a single species, the greater lophorina. This is now the type species. The genus name combines the Ancient Greek lophos meaning "crest" or "tuft" with rhis, rhinos meaning "nostrils. The contents of this genus and that of Ptiloris is based on a molecular phylogenetic study published in 2017.

The genus contains three species: 
Greater lophorina (Lophorina superba)
Crescent-caped lophorina (Lophorina niedda)
Lesser lophorina (Lophorina minor)

See also
 Bird-of-paradise

References

 
Bird genera
Taxa named by Louis Jean Pierre Vieillot